East Uniacke is a small community in the Canadian province of Nova Scotia, located in  The Municipality of the District of East Hants in Hants County.

East Uniacke Road is the main route passing through the area, connecting Trunk 1 to the south (via Etter Rd.) to Route 354 (Beaver Bank Road) to the north.

References
East Uniacke on Destination Nova Scotia

Communities in Hants County, Nova Scotia
General Service Areas in Nova Scotia